Ann Forrest Bell (born 29 April 1938) is a British actress, best known for playing war internee Marion Jefferson in the BBC Second World War drama series Tenko (1981–84).

She was born in Wallasey, Cheshire, the daughter of John Forrest Bell and Marjorie (née Byrom) Bell, and educated at Birkenhead High School.

She played the title role in a BBC adaptation of Jane Eyre (1963) in addition to many guest roles on television, including Edgar Wallace Mysteries, Gideon's Way, The Avengers, The Sentimental Agent, The Saint, Armchair Theatre, For Whom the Bell Tolls (1965), Danger Man, The Baron, Mystery and Imagination, The Troubleshooters, Callan, Journey to the Unknown, Sherlock Holmes (the 1968 episode "The Sign of Four" with Peter Cushing), Department S, The Lost Boys, Enemy at the Door, Shoestring, Tumbledown, Blackeyes, Heartbeat, Inspector Morse, Agatha Christie's Poirot, Midsomer Murders, Casualty, Holby City, The Forsyte Saga, The Bill and Waking the Dead.  In 1968 she appeared in the Dennis Potter play Shaggy Dog, part of The Company of Five, a London Weekend Television anthology series of six plays featuring the same five actors.

She was married to character actor Robert Lang from 1971 until his death in 2004. The couple had two children. Bell appeared on screen with Lang in Tenko Reunion, in which he played Teddy Forster-Brown. They also appeared together in an episode of Heartbeat ("Bread and Circuses", 2002).

In 2010, Bell featured in the Doctor Who audio drama A Thousand Tiny Wings as well as the 2012 audio play Night of the Stormcrow which also featured her Tenko castmate Louise Jameson.

Filmography
 A Midsummer Night's Dream (1959) - Hermia (voice)
Edgar Wallace Mysteries - 'Flat  Two' episode - (1962) - Susan
 Stopover Forever (1964) - Sue Chambers
 Dr. Terror's House of Horrors (1965) - Ann Rogers (segment "Creeping Vine")
 Fahrenheit 451 (1966) - Doris (uncredited)
 The Witches (1966) - Sally Benson
 The Shuttered Room (1967) - Mary Whately, Susannah's Mother
 To Sir, with Love (1967) - Mrs. Dare
 A Testing Job (1968, educational film) - Mrs Bell
 The Reckoning (1970) - Rosemary Marler
 The Statue (1971) - Pat Demarest
 Spectre (1977, TV Movie) - Anitra Cyon
 Champions (1984) - Valda Embiricos
 Head Over Heels (1993, TV Series) - Gracie Ellis
 When Saturday Comes (1996) - Sarah Muir
 The Ice House (1997, TV Mini-Series) - Molly Phillips
 The Land Girls (1998) - Philip's Mother
 Up at the Villa (2000) - Beryl Bryson
 The Last Hangman (2005) - Violet Van Der Elst

References

External links
 
 Photo from 1963 BBC adaptation of Jane Eyre

1938 births
Living people
British television actresses
People educated at Birkenhead High School Academy
People from Wallasey